Stadium Gal is a football stadium in Irun, Gipuzkoa, Basque Country, Spain. It is owned by Real Unión, currently in Segunda División B. The capacity of the stadium is 5,500 spectators.

The stadium is located on the left bank of the Bidasoa river, which forms the border between Spain and France (on the right bank is the French-Basque town of Hendaye); it is about 300 metres from the road and rail bridges which are the crossing points over the river between the nations.

References

External links

Venue information
Estadios de Espana 
Frank Jasperneite page

Football venues in the Basque Country (autonomous community)
Multi-purpose stadiums in Spain
Real Unión
Irun
Sports venues completed in 1926